Zhou Qifeng (born October 1947) is a Chinese chemist and academician of the Chinese Academy of Sciences. He served as president of Peking University from 2008 to 2013. In 1995, he became executive vice-dean of the graduate school of Peking University and later as vice-provost of Peking University until 2001.

He formerly served as president of the International Union of Pure and Applied Chemistry (IUPAC) and member of Chinese Academy of Sciences. He is also a deputy of National People's Congress of the People’s Republic of China.

Early life and education
Zhou Qifeng was an undergraduate student in Peking University from 1965 to 1970, and became a faculty member immediately after his graduation in 1970. He studied at University of Massachusetts Amherst and was awarded Master of Science in 1981 and Doctor of Philosophy in 1983.

He was elected an academician of the Chinese Academy of Sciences in 1999.

References

See also
 List of members of the 12th National People's Congress Standing Committee

1947 births
Living people
Jilin University people
Members of the Chinese Academy of Sciences
Presidents of Peking University
University of Massachusetts Amherst alumni
Members of the Standing Committee of the 12th National People's Congress